is a 2017 Japanese romantic drama film directed by Yuya Ishii. It is based on a book of poetry of the same name written by Tahi Saihate and published in 2016.

The film premiered at the 2017 Berlin Film Festival.

Plot
The Tokyo Night Sky Is Always the Densest Shade of Blue follows the relationship between two young adults, half-blind construction worker Shinji and nurse-cum-bartender Mika.

Cast
Shizuka Ishibashi as Mika
Sosuke Ikematsu as Shinji
Tetsushi Tanaka
Ryuhei Matsuda
Paul Magsalin
Mikako Ichikawa
Ryo Sato
Takahiro Miura

Reception
Reviewing the film after its showing at the Berlin Film Festival, The Hollywood Reporters Deborah Young called The Tokyo Night Sky... "an earnest, at times poetic, drama about teen alienation". Writing for the South China Morning Post, James Marsh said the film "sets itself apart from more commercial romantic fare", but observed that "the narrative seems reluctant to bring its protagonists company".

Mark Schilling, reviewing the film for The Japan Times, found that the movie's "realism... and [its] poetic love story, with coincidence piled on incredible coincidence, make for an ungainly fit", also noting that "the dialogue, much of which seems to have been lifted from Saihate's work, often sounds like nothing anyone would actually say".

References

Further reading

External links
 An interview with director Yuya Ishii regarding the film
 
 
 Official website

2017 films
Japanese romantic drama films
2010s Japanese-language films
Best Film Kinema Junpo Award winners
Films directed by Yuya Ishii
Berlin International Film Festival